Bientina is a comune (municipality) in the Province of Pisa in the Italian region Tuscany.

History 
The toponym Bientina is attested the first time in 793 as Blentina and probably comes from the Etruscan name Plitine.

Geography

Territory 
Bientina is located between Lucca's plain (Piana di Lucca) and the Valdarno.

To the north of the town there was once the largest lake in Tuscany, the Lago di Bientina, until it was drained in 1859 and converted to farmland.

The municipality is formed by the municipal seat of Bientina and the villages (frazioni) of Caccialupi, Puntone, Quattro Strade and Santa Colomba.

Climate 
Bientina experiences a Mediterranean Climate like other cities in Central Italy.

Being more distant from the sea, winters are usually less mild than Pisa and summers are warmer.

The climatic classification is "Zone D, 1856 GR/G"

Main sights

Religious architecture 
 Church of San Domenico (1621)
 Church of Santa Maria Assunta (medieval - expanded and renovated in the mid-1600)
 Church of Madonna del Bosco in Santa Colomba
 Oratory of San Girolamo (1640), home to the museum of ancient history of Bientina
 Oratory of San Pietro and Rocco (17th century)
 Oratory of San Giusto, the first church of Bientina (12th century)

Civil architecture 
 Palazzo Pancani
 La Mora tower (13th century)
 Torre Civica (Torre del Frantoio) (13th century) - center of cultural activity.
 Torre del Giglio (13th century)
 Loggetta del Palazzo Comunale (17th century)

Transport

Roads 
Bientina is crossed by the Strada provinciale 439 Sarzanese Valdera and some secondary roads. Public transportation is performed by the company CTT Nord.

Trains 
Until 1944 the town also had a train station along the former railway Lucca-Pontedera; the dilapidated building is still visible along the main road 25.

Notable people
 Aldo Puccinelli
 Gaetano Polidori
 John Polidori
 Enrico Rossi

International relations 

Bientina is twinned with  Saint-Rémy-de-Provence since 1997

References

External links

 Official website

Cities and towns in Tuscany